Galeotti is a surname, and may refer to;

 Bethany Joy Galeotti (born 1981), American singer and actress
 Cesare Galeotti (1872-1929), Italian composer and pianist
 Henri Guillaume Galeotti (1814–1858), Belgian botanist
 Mark Galeotti (born 1965), British scholar
 Sebastiano Galeotti (1656–1746), Italian painter
 Daniela Galeotti (born 1977), Italian high jumpers

Italian-language surnames